Anna Semyonovna Andreyeva (23 June 1915 – 1997) was a Soviet track and field athlete who competed mainly in the shot put. She was the gold medallist at the 1950 European Athletics Championships and a four-time Soviet national champion.

Career
Born and raised in Penza in the Russian SSR of the Soviet Union, she was among the first Soviet women to reach world level in the shot put. She ranked in the top ten globally in 1936 and 1937. Andreyeva placed within the world's top five athletes for eleven years consecutively from the period of 1942 to 1953.

At the age of 33 she made a career breakthrough with her first throw over fourteen metres. Onlyher compatriot Tatyana Sevryukova was better that year and she had broken the women's shot put world record.

The 1950 season proved to be the career-defining one for the 35-year-old Andreyeva. First, she won her fourth and final national title in the shot put. This record lasted until July 1952, when the emergence of Galina Zybina saw the record brought near seventeen metres by the end of the decade. Andreyeva helped establish a pattern of dominance by Soviet women in the shot put, with Tamara Press in the 1960s, Nadezhda Chizhova in the 1970s and Natalya Lisovskaya in the 1980s retaining the record for the Soviets.

Although she did not win any further international titles, she was the world's number one ranked athlete in 1951. She continued to throw at a high level, but the rise of throwers such as Zabina, Tochenova, Sevryukova and Tamara Tyshkevich left her further down the national rankings (though still fifth globally in the 1952 Olympic year). She was finally beaten by Antonia Ivanova in 1973. She did not compete at a global level after 1957.

During her career she lived in Moscow and trained with the "Vodnik" sports society before switching to Dynamo Sports Club in 1942. She was trained by Dmitry Petrovich Markov, himself a former Soviet shot put champion. She died in 1997.

National titles
Soviet Athletics Championships
Shot put: 1938, 1948, 1949, 1950

International competitions

See also
List of European Athletics Championships medalists (women)

References

1915 births
1997 deaths
People from Penza
Soviet female shot putters
Soviet female discus throwers
European Athletics Championships medalists
World record setters in athletics (track and field)